Adolph Kissell (September 11, 1920 – August 7, 1983) was an American football halfback. He played for the Chicago Bears in 1942.

References

1920 births
1983 deaths
American football halfbacks
Boston College Eagles football players
Chicago Bears players